Bearpen Hollow is a valley in Carter County in the U.S. state of Missouri.

Bearpen Hollow was named after a type of trap early settlers set out to catch bears.

References

Valleys of Carter County, Missouri
Valleys of Missouri